SubTile is a lightweight platform independent Subversion (SVN) client, which runs on all platforms where Mozilla XULRunner is available.
GUI itself is released under the GNU General Public License.

See also 

 Subversion - an open-source application used for revision control
 Comparison of Subversion clients

References

External links
 Official website

Free software
Apache Subversion
Cross-platform software
Software that uses XUL
Version control GUI tools